Bembecia priesneri is a moth of the family Sesiidae. It is found in Turkey (Cappadocia and the Taurus Mountains) and some nearby Dodecanese islands (including Rhodes).

The wingspan is 19–25 mm. Adults are on wing in late August and September.

The larvae feed on the roots of Psoralea bituminosa and Ononis species, including Ononis spinosa.

References

Moths described in 1998
Sesiidae
Moths of Europe
Moths of Asia